The 54th Annual TV Week Logie Awards was held on Sunday 15 April 2012 at the Crown Palladium in Melbourne, and broadcast on the Nine Network. Public voting for the "Most Popular" categories were conducted through an online survey from 5 December 2011 to 19 February 2012. Nominations were announced on 18 March 2012. The red carpet coverage which preceded the ceremony was hosted by Jules Lund, Sonia Kruger, Livinia Nixon and Shane Crawford. Musical performers at the event included One Direction, Flo Rida, Tony Bennett, Seal and Delta Goodrem.

Winners and nominees
In the tables below, winners are listed first and highlighted in bold.

Gold Logie

Acting/Presenting

Most Popular Programs

Most Outstanding Programs

Performers
 
Flo Rida
One Direction
Tony Bennett
Seal
Delta Goodrem

Presenters
Shaun Micallef
Adam Hills
Julia Morris
Hamish Blake
Andy Lee
Dave Hughes

In Memoriam
The In Memoriam segment was introduced by Mick Molloy who spoke of the passing of Bill Hunter. Bernard Fanning's "Watch Over Me" was played during the tribute. The following deceased were honoured:

 Sean Flannery, journalist
 Howard Rubic ACS, cinematographer
 Killer Karl Kox, WCW wrestler
 Martin Kosinar, actor
 Michele Fawdon, actress
 Diane Cilento, actress
 David Ngoombujarra, actor
 Ian Carroll, executive producer
 Carl Bleazby, actor
 John Bean, cameraman
 Gary Ticehurst, helicopter pilot
 Paul Lockyer, journalist
 Andy Whitfield, actor
 Harold Hopkins, actor
 Jay Dee Springbett, music executive, presenter
 Sheila Sibley, writer
 David Fordham, sports commentator
 Brian Williams, producer, director
 Jon Blake, actor
 Godfrey Philipp, creator Magic Circle Club
 Trish Ricketts, publicist
 Rex Mossop, sports broadcaster
 Zoran Janjic, animator
 Bill Newman, entertainer
 Wayne Fosternelli, floor manager
 Bernie Keenan, news chief of staff
 Lloyd Cunningham, actor
 Sarah Watt, writer, director
 Bob Davis, football commentator
 Cliff Neville, producer
 Robin Oliver, television critic
 Denise Morgan, writer
 Vince Lovegrove, musician, producer
 Googie Withers AO CBE, actress
 Reg Whiteman, original Fat Cat
 Peter Hepworth, writer
 Tikki Taylor, entertainer
 Keith Smith, children's TV producer, presenter
 Kristian Anderson, editor
 Ian Turpie, entertainer 

During the tribute, an image of David Gulpilil was shown in place of David Ngoombujarra. Nine and TV Week later apologised for the error.

References

External links
 

2012
2012 television awards
2012 in Australian television
2012 awards in Australia